Hussein Mohammed Rabie al-Zawahiri was one of 14 people subjected to extraordinary rendition by the CIA prior to the 2001 declaration of a War on Terror.

He was captured in Malaysia, and renditioned to Egypt.

He had no known connection to terrorism, other than that he was the younger brother of militant leader Ayman al-Zawahiri. He was released in 2000.

References

20th-century births
Living people
Year of birth missing (living people)
People subject to extraordinary rendition by the United States